Wen fu, translated as "Essay on Literature", "The Poetic Exposition on Literature" or "Rhymeprose on Literature", is an important work in the history of fu poetry itself written in the Fu poetic form by the poet, general, and statesman Lu Ji (261–303), which expounds the philosophical basis of poetry and its rhetorical forms. Achilles Fang wrote that it is considered "one of the most articulate treatises on Chinese poetics. The extent of its influence in Chinese literary history is equaled only by that of the sixth-century The Literary Mind and the Carving of Dragons of Liu Xie. It is called a "hymn of praise for the craft and art of writing and a specific, prescriptive handbook for the writer."

Form and philosophy 

Stephen Owen explains that Wen fu is a work of "both literature and literary thought", "a work of such originality that it could not have been anticipated from the works that preceded it.... nothing like it ever had been written concerning literature..." The work introduced new vocabulary of terms which remain influential, although in many cases, problematic. Moving away from questions such as the ethical purpose of literature, its social context, or the expression of personality, Lu Ji turns to the Neo-Taoist theory of mind and its cosmological basis. This philosophical stance describes the poet's mind as wandering through the microcosmos which is within his own body in search of encounters which form the origin of literary work. The fu as a poetic form was known for its verbal display, usually cataloging and listing an array of items in order to say everything that could be said on a topic. Lu presents this philosophical stance in a series of balanced elements which unfold in an orderly way. For instance, Lu balances what the poet learns from thinking against what is learned from reading. These antithetical elements are then amplified and repeated in different contexts, often with statements and counter-statements in order to avoid being one-sided.

The Wen fu is rhymed, but does not employ regular rhythmic patterns: hence the term "rhymeprose".

Wen fu has influenced modern poets such as Ezra Pound, Gary Snyder, Howard Nemirov, Eleanor Wilner, and Carolyn Kizer.

Translations 

 Chen Shixiang, translator,  Internet Archive free access link The first translation into English,reprinted in Cyril Birch, ed. p. 222. 232
.
 
 Stephen Owen, "The Poetic Exposition on Literature." Annotated, with an introductory section.

Notes

References

External links 
 Lu Chi's Wen Fu: The Art of Writing

Chinese poetry
Jin dynasty (266–420) literature